Nina Skeime Kostøl (born May 21, 1962) is a former Norwegian cross-country skier who competed from 1982 to 1991. She won two medals in the 4 × 5 km relay FIS Nordic World Ski Championships (silver: 1987, bronze: 1989).

Skeime's best individual career finish was sixth in the 10 km event at the 1987 FIS Nordic World Ski Championships in Oberstdorf.

Cross-country skiing results
All results are sourced from the International Ski Federation (FIS).

World Championships
 2 medals – (1 silver, 1 bronze)

World Cup

Season standings

Team podiums

7 podiums  

Note:   Until the 1999 World Championships, World Championship races were included in the World Cup scoring system.

References

External links

Norwegian female cross-country skiers
1962 births
Living people
FIS Nordic World Ski Championships medalists in cross-country skiing